In mathematics, two positive (or signed or complex) measures  and  defined on a measurable space  are called singular if there exist two disjoint measurable sets  whose union is  such that  is zero on all measurable subsets of  while  is zero on all measurable subsets of  This is denoted by 

A refined form of Lebesgue's decomposition theorem decomposes a singular measure into a singular continuous measure and a discrete measure. See below for examples.

Examples on Rn

As a particular case, a measure defined on the Euclidean space  is called singular, if it is singular with respect to the Lebesgue measure on this space. For example, the Dirac delta function is a singular measure.

Example. A discrete measure.

The Heaviside step function on the real line,

has the Dirac delta distribution  as its distributional derivative. This is a measure on the real line, a "point mass" at  However, the Dirac measure  is not absolutely continuous with respect to Lebesgue measure  nor is  absolutely continuous with respect to   but  if  is any open set not containing 0, then  but 

Example. A singular continuous measure.

The Cantor distribution has a cumulative distribution function that is continuous but not absolutely continuous, and indeed its absolutely continuous part is zero: it is singular continuous.

Example. A singular continuous measure on 

The upper and lower Fréchet–Hoeffding bounds are singular distributions in two dimensions.

See also

References

 Eric W Weisstein, CRC Concise Encyclopedia of Mathematics, CRC Press, 2002. .
 J Taylor, An Introduction to Measure and Probability, Springer, 1996. .

Integral calculus
Measures (measure theory)